Gunnilbo socken is a former socken of Skinnskattebergs bergslag in Västmanland, Sweden. The socken is situated on a tributary of Hedströmmen, in the wooded countryside north of the Lillsvan and Långsvan lakes. Most buildings are near the sites of the old Bockhammar and Färna ironworks. Near the Gunnilbo Church is the Karlslunds school, built in 1879.

History

The first reference to Gunnilbo was in 1403 as Gunillabodhom, the prefix being the female name Gunhild and the suffix the plural of village. It represented the area where the church stands today.

In 1612 Gustavus Adolphus gave permission for the construction of a wooden chapel in the village of Gunnilbo.  At that time the village belonged to Odensvi parish, which was called Odensvi fjärding. The chapel was described as a hall "where the Word of God could be preached." There was no vicar stationed there in the early years, but housing for the priest was allotted to Tarmansbo.

In 1638 Christina, Queen of Sweden declared Gunnilbo its own parish and it was broken off from Odensvi. The vicarage was moved from Tarmansbo to Österbo. 1649 Gunnilbo and Heds parish were declared bergslager and became part of Skinnskattebergs bergslag.

Since the old church was considered too small, construction for a new parish church on the same site began in 1661. The chapel was either expanded or the new church was built on top of the demolished chapel. It was not finished until 1665. A decision was made in 1794 to build a new church would be built, but it was not completed until 1835.

With the municipal reform in 1862, it became the parish's responsibility for the ecclesiastical questions to Gunnilbo congregation and for the bourgeois ruling to Gunnilbo rural municipality. In 1895 it was one of the 22 Baptist churches in the Westmanland Association, as were Norberg, Hed and Skinnskatteberg. There were a total of 1,590 members in the Westmanland Association churches. The Gunnilbo Church minister was A.G. Anderson. The church was restored in 1966.

The country, or rural, municipality was incorporated in 1952 in Skinnskattebergs and in 1971 Gunnilbo came under the Skinnskattebergs municipality. The parish was in 2006 in Skinnskatteberg with Hed and Gunnilbo congregation.

The population of Gunnilbo socken was 2,023 in 1880 and 1,692 in 1907.

Gunnilbo Church leaders
The following are lists of the churches vicars and chaplains:

Vicars

Chaplains

Gunnilbo River
Beginning the 1600s or earlier dams were built along the Gunnilbo River to support mining enterprises. Even so, the river ecosystem was not hugely impacted. Starting in 1995 the river was affected by the change in regulations and decisions made by a remote landowner to maximize the potential output of a power station built downstream of the river. It was reported by the Swedish Society for Nature Conservation in 2002 that by changing water flow, the station had greater output but the riverbed sometimes went dry. As a result, there was a loss of fauna, or animal life, on the river, particularly the bottom-feeding dipper and brown trout. Any water life comes from upstream, inland waterways and is mostly water louse. The water is cloudy and has a low oxygen rate that makes it difficult to bottom feeding fish to survive. Local residents have campaigned for the return of responsible management of the waterway and the hydropower plant so that it can return to a healthy ecosystem.

References

Citations

Sources 
 
 Bruno Holmbergs anteckningar om hyttor och hammare. (in Swedish)

Sockens in Sweden